Sass de Mura is a mountain of the Dolomites in Veneto, Italy. It has an elevation of 2,547 metres.

References

Mountains of the Alps
Mountains of Veneto
Dolomites